The 2009–10 season was the 143rd season of competitive association football played by Chesterfield Football Club, a professional football club based in Chesterfield, Derbyshire, England. During the 2009–10 season, the club competed in League Two, the fourth tier of English football, for the third year in succession.

Season summary 
On 9 June 2009, John Sheridan was named as manager of Chesterfield in League Two. Signing a three-year contract with the club, he appointed Tommy Wright as assistant manager and Mark Crossley as coach. Chesterfield finished eighth in League Two.

At the end of the season, the club left Saltergate, and moved to the newly built B2net Stadium.

Competitions

League Two

League table

Results

FA Cup

League Cup

Football League Trophy

References 

Chesterfield F.C. seasons
Chesterfield F.C.